Catie is a given name. Notable people with the name include:

 Catie Ball (born 1951), American Olympic swimmer
 Catie Curtis (born 1965), American singer-songwriter
 Catie Lazarus (1976–2020), American writer, storyteller and talk show host
 Catie Munnings (born 1997), British rally driver
 Catie Rosemurgy, American poet

See also
 Katie
 Katherine